Dalophis multidentatus is an eel in the family Ophichthidae (worm/snake eels). It was described by Jacques Blache and Marie-Louise Bauchot in 1972. It is known from a single specimen collected from the Saloum River in Senegal, in the eastern Atlantic Ocean. It is known through this specimen to form burrows in sand or mud on the continental shelf, and to dwell at a depth of 50 metres. Males are able to reach a total length of 15.3 centimetres.

References

Ophichthidae
Taxa named by Jacques Blache
Taxa named by Marie-Louise Bauchot
Fish described in 1972